Elfyn Lewis (born 1969) is a Welsh painter who won the National Eisteddfod of Wales Gold Medal for fine art in 2009 and the Welsh Artist of the Year prize in 2010.

Lewis was born in Porthmadog, Gwynedd and studied at the University of Central Lancashire, Preston, before gaining an MA in Fine Art from the University of Wales Institute, Cardiff in 1998. He lives and works in Grangetown, Cardiff.

Lewis's paintings are held in the collections of the Cynon Valley Museum, MOMA Wales and Gwynedd Museum and Art Gallery.

Elfyn Lewis was elected to the Royal Cambrian Academy, Conwy in 2017

References

External links
 

Living people
1969 births
21st-century Welsh painters
21st-century Welsh male artists
21st-century male artists
People from Porthmadog
Welsh Eisteddfod Gold Medal winners
People from Gwynedd
Welsh male painters